Clark Fork Township is one of fourteen townships in Cooper County, Missouri, USA.  As of the 2000 census, its population was 598.

Clark Fork Township was named after the creek of the same name within its borders.

Geography
According to the United States Census Bureau, Clark Fork Township covers an area of 52.64 square miles (136.32 square kilometers); of this, 52.6 square miles (136.24 square kilometers, 99.94 percent) is land and 0.03 square miles (0.08 square kilometers, 0.06 percent) is water.

Unincorporated towns
 Clarks Fork at 
 Lone Elm at

Adjacent townships
 Saline Township (northeast)
 Prairie Home Township (east)
 North Moniteau Township (southeast)
 Kelly Township (southwest)
 Palestine Township (west)
 Boonville Township (northwest)

Cemeteries
The township contains these two cemeteries: McCullough and Toler.

Major highways
  Missouri Route 87

School districts
 Boonville School District
 Cooper County C-4
 Prairie Home R-V School District

Political districts
 Missouri's 6th congressional district
 State House District 117
 State Senate District 21

References
 United States Census Bureau 2008 TIGER/Line Shapefiles
 United States Board on Geographic Names (GNIS)
 United States National Atlas

External links
 US-Counties.com
 City-Data.com

Townships in Cooper County, Missouri
Townships in Missouri